Farm to Market Road 1161 (FM 1161) is a farm-to-market road in Wharton County in the U.S. state of Texas. The two-lane highway begins at FM 102 at Egypt, heads in an easterly direction through Spanish Camp and Hungerford and ends at a rural road to the east of Hungerford.

Route description
A two-lane highway along its entire route, FM 1161 begins at a stop sign on FM 102 in Egypt and heads to the east-southeast past the local post office. At  from its starting point, FM 1164 passes the Heard Northington Plantation Museum and two state historical markers. At the junction, FM 1161 turns sharply to the northeast as it goes through the community of Spanish Camp. In this stretch, the highway heads first east-northeast, then east and finally east-southeast before crossing the Union Pacific Railroad and coming to a two-way stop sign at SH 60 and Future Business Interstate 69/Business U.S. Route 59. FM 1161 goes through the southern part of Hungerford for  before crossing a bridge over Future Interstate 69 (Future I-69)/U.S. Route 59 (US 59). Traffic on FM 1161 can access I-69/US 59 in both directions via a half-cloverleaf on the south side. From I-69/US 59 to the end of FM 1161 at Boone's Bend Road is an additional .

History

Major intersections

See also

References

1161
Transportation in Wharton County, Texas